Vilen Mitrofanovich Strutinsky (16 October 1929 – 28 June 1993) was a Soviet nuclear physicist.

Strutinsky graduated from secondary school in 1946 in Odessa (after his family during World War II had been evacuated to Yekaterinburg). He graduated in theoretical physics in 1952 from Kharkov University. From 1953 to 1970 he worked at the department of nuclear theory in the Kurchatov Institute in Moscow. In 1959 he defended his PhD  at the National Research Nuclear University MEPhI, and in 1965 he received the habilitation from the Joint Institute for Nuclear Research. He was a visiting scientist in 1956 in the Netherlands, in 1957–1958 at the Niels Bohr Institute in Copenhagen, in 1960 in Canada, and in 1963–1964 in the United States.

In 1966, Strutinsky made a breakthrough concerning the problem of incorporating shell effects into nuclear deformation energies higher than those of the liquid drop model (LDM). For this problem he devised an averaging method, now known as the Strutinsky smoothing method. At a 1969 Symposium in Lysekil, Sweden, he presented the results of applying his shell-correction method to calculating fission barriers, giving a physical explanation of the fission isomer — this was an experimental fact which had not yet been explained theoretically. The Strutinsky energy theorem and Strutinsky shell-corrections are applicable to various many-fermion systems, such as metal clusters and semiconductor quantum dots.

In the 1970s, Strutinsky led a research group at the Kiev Institute of Nuclear Research (KINR). They worked on many body theory and various aspects of nuclear dynamics. Strutinsky, in collaboration with Alexander G. Magner, extended Gutzwiller's semiclassical theory of shell structure (Gutzwiller trace formula) to a quasiclassical theory of the nuclear shell structure (1977). This extension enabled physicists to derive new results for realistic shell-model potentials, for systems with continuous symmetries, and for systems with mixed symmetries.

In the 1980s, Strutinsky worked on correlations in partial waves in heavy-ion deep inelastic collisions. In 1991, he was a visiting scientist in the nuclear theory group at the Technical University of Munich. In 1992–1993, he was a visiting professor at the Istituto Nazionale di Fisica Nucleare in Italy.

Awards and honors
1978: Tom W. Bonner Prize in Nuclear Physics
1979: Honorary Doctorate from the University of Copenhagen
1991: Humboldt Prize (1991).

Selected publications
Strutinsky Nuclear deformation energy, Sov. J. Nucl. Phys., vol. 3, 1966, p. 449

Strutinsky Semiclassical theory of nuclear shell structure, Nucleonica, vol. 20, 1975, pp. 679–716

References

1929 births
1993 deaths
Quantum physicists
Soviet physicists
20th-century Ukrainian physicists
Theoretical physicists
National University of Kharkiv alumni